The first known reference to a Mayor of Bedford in England was in 1264.

Prior to the Municipal Corporations Act, 1835, the mayor of Bedford came into office on 29 September. The first mayor of the reformed corporation came into office on 1 January 1836, and subsequent mayors on 9 November. After the Local Government Act, 1948, and the Local Government Act, 1972, the mayors from 1949 onwards came into office in May. The civic mayor was replaced by a directly elected mayor in 2002.

Since April 2009 the Borough of Bedford is a unitary authority, with the executive having the powers and functions of both a non-metropolitan district and a non-metropolitan county.

List of Mayors of Bedford

Civic mayors

Source: "Past Mayors" Bedford Borough Council
1393: William Brown, MP for Bedford, 1397
1414–15: John Kent, MP for Bedford, 1406
1416–17: John Kent
1429–30: John Frepurs, MP for Bedford, 1417 and 1427
1432–34: Thomas Hunt, MP for Bedford, 1420
1437–38: John Frepurs
1444–46: John Frepurs
1528–29: John Baker, MP for Bedford, 1529
1547–48: William Hall, MP for Bedford, 1554
1554–55: William Hall
1829–30: Sir William Long
1834–35: Dr. George Witt: head of Bedford Infirmary and a Fellow of the Royal Society.
1855–56: George Hurst
1856–57: William Wells Kilpin
1857–58: George Handscomb Miller
1858–62: John Howard
1862–63: Robert Couchman
1863–65: John Howard	 
1865–67: William Joseph Nash
1867–69: Thomas Tokelove Gray 
1869–70: Augustus Edgar Burch 
1870–71: John Richard Bull
1871–72: James Coombs 
1872–73: Frederick Thomas Young
1873–75: George Hurst
1875–77: James Thomas Hobson
1877–78: John Usher Taylor
1878: George Hurst
1878–79: Thomas Gwyn Empy Elger
1879–80: John Elworthy Cutcliffe
1880–81: James Thomas Hobson
1881–82: James Woodward Hill
1882–83: Luke Cherry
1883–85: Joshua Hawkins
1885–86: Edwin Ransom
1886–87: George Hurst
1887–90: Joshua Hawkins
1891–92: James Coombs
1892–93: Frederick Augustus Blaydes
1893–95: George Wells
1895–96: Frederick Augustus Blaydes
1896–99: George Wells
1901-02: Geoffrey Howard
1902-03: Hedley Baxter, Conservative
2000–01: Hazel Mary Mitchell
2001–02: Pat Olney
2002: Judith Cunningham

Directly elected mayors
 2002–09: Frank Branston (died in office)
 2009–: Dave Hodgson

References

Mayors
Mayors
Mayors
Bedford